Ancient Inventions was a BBC historical documentary series released in 1998. It was presented by former Monty Python member Terry Jones and looked at great inventions of the ancient world. The series is split into 3 episodes, namely City Life, Sex and Love, and War and Conflicts, all around 50 min long.

External links

Official dvd release

Works by Terry Jones
1998 British television series debuts
1998 British television series endings
BBC television documentaries about prehistoric and ancient history